The 1999 Frontier @ the Glen was a NASCAR Winston Cup Series race held at Watkins Glen International, Watkins Glen, New York on August 15, 1999. It was the 21st points-paying event of the 1999 NASCAR Winston Cup Series season. Rusty Wallace won the pole, and Jeff Gordon won the race for the third consecutive year. A total of 49 cars attempted the race.

Entry list

Practice and Qualifying 
Practice and Kendall Pole Day, scheduled for Friday August 13, were both delayed for several hours due to inclement weather conditions. First-round qualifying would be held that day, allowing qualifying positions 1-25 to be locked into the field, but second-round qualifying would be rained out, forcing spots 25-36 to be locked in based on their first round qualifying speeds, and positions 37-43 were locked in based on owner points. Two drivers who failed to qualify, Jack Baldwin and Paul Gentilozzi made their only attempts at a Winston Cup event during this race. Rusty Wallace set a new track record with his pole-qualifying speed at 121.234 mph.

As was common with many road races, several road course ringers attempted to qualify. Two drivers, Boris Said and Ron Fellows, led their first Winston Cup laps during this race. Said, David Murry, and Ted Christopher made their first Winston Cup starts. Christopher also competed in the companion NASCAR Featherlite Modified Series and NASCAR Busch North Series races that weekend, winning and placing second respectively. In addition, full-time Winston Cup driver Jerry Nadeau, who began his career on road courses, led his first career laps in a Winston Cup race.

Full qualifying results

Race recap  
The only drivers who failed to finish underwent mechanical failures. During the race, there were four caution flags for cars (#11, #36, #40, and #45) off the track in the inner loop at separate times, for oil on the race track, and for the #26 car wrecking. 16.7 percent of the race's 90 laps were spent under caution.

1991 winner Ernie Irvan made his final NASCAR Winston Cup start in this race. Irvan suffered career-ending head injuries while practicing his Busch Series car at Michigan International Speedway the following week. David Murry's lone career start came in this race. This race was also the last win for Ray Evernham as crew chief. He left Jeff Gordon's team several weeks later to start his own Winston Cup team.

ESPN carried the coverage for the race. Regular color commentator Benny Parsons missed the race due to a recent operation, however called the telecast in the middle of the race to talk to fellow commentators and viewers. 

When the race began to come to a close, the race came down to Jeff Gordon and Canadian road course ringer Ron Fellows. Ron Fellows, in a one-time drive in the #87 NEMCO Motorsports Chevy, led 3 laps late in the race and got passed by Gordon with less than 30 laps to go. Fellows remained in second for several laps and ultimately had one shot at the lead on a restart with 2 laps to go. Fellows tried to pass Gordon in turn 1, but Gordon held off the challenge, pulling away to win the race by 5 car-lengths. Gordon praised Fellows for a fun race in victory lane. It was Fellows' first of 2 runner-up finishes in the Cup series race at Watkins Glen.

Ron Fellows was not the only road course ringer in the race. Boris Said started 2nd in the race and led some laps early in the race in the #14 car owned by Mark Simo. However, Said's day came to an end on lap 48 with a blown engine.

Coming off a win at the Brickyard 400, Dale Jarrett finished fourth to gain twenty-four points on his points lead over Mark Martin. His points lead was at 300 points at the end of the race.

Race results

References

Frontier At the Glen
Frontier At the Glen
NASCAR races at Watkins Glen International